Spital is a village in the Metropolitan Borough of Wirral, in Merseyside, England. It is located mid-way on the Wirral Peninsula, and is mostly incorporated into the town of Bebington and the most westerly point of Spital forms the most northern edge of Bromborough.

Spital is primarily a residential suburb which has apartments, and close proximity to the motorway network. The area contains shops, two bars, a chip shop and a primary school.

Toponym
The name "Spital" is a place or building known as a "spital house" that acted as a hospital or colony for lepers. However, the name might have been derived from the term "hospitality" - due to the large number of people working at the manorial estate in Poulton Lancelyn. Other original names of the village were "Poulton cum Spital" and "Spital Old Hall" until Spital was formally adopted at the end of the 19th century. It could also be a corruption of the Welsh ysbyty, as seen in place names like Spittal, Pembrokeshire.

History
Legend has it that Irish patron saint, St Patrick, blessed a well in the local Brotherton Park during a trip to England.

Spital has a history spanning over 800 years. The first recorded dwelling in the area was a small chapel built sometime before AD 1183 with the name St. Thomas the Martyr. It is not known who built this chapel but was probably used by workers and owners of the Poulton Estate, founded in 1133 at nearby Poulton Lancelyn. In 1283, the brethren of Bebington were given licence to use the forested land where Spital stands today to be used as a hospital for lepers. This hospital was probably attached to the chapel already in the area, but there are no remains of this building today.

The area became more popular during the 20th century after Spital Station on the Chester to Birkenhead railway was connected to the Mersey Railway line in 1891, and businessmen and workers could easily reach places of work, primarily in Liverpool. Spital was a particularly popular place to live with sea merchants and ships' captains due its proximity to the River Mersey and Irish Sea during the height of maritime activity in the area.

Spital was originally part of Cheshire when on 1 April 1974 it was absorbed into the new administrative county of Merseyside created through the reforms of the Local Government Act 1972. Spital has since grown and is now part of the larger town of Bebington which borders Birkenhead. After the ending of the workhouse system in 1930, Wirral Workhouse was renamed Clatterbridge (County) General Hospital and under the National Health Service became Clatterbridge Hospital. In 1958, it became a centre specialising in Oncology. The centre was built in to enlarge cancer care services from a cramped site on Myrtle Street in Liverpool - since then the site has been expanded and the hospital has been awarded 3 out of 3 stars in the NHS scoring system.

Geography

Governance
Spital is situated within the UK Parliamentary Constituency of Wirral South. Since the 2010 General Election the constituency Member of Parliament is Alison McGovern (Labour).

At local government level, Spital and the neighbouring village of Poulton Lancelyn are part of the Clatterbridge Ward of the Metropolitan Borough of Wirral.

Demography
 1801 - 87
 1851 - 294
 1901 - 487
 1951 - 1,257
 2001 - 4,190

The 2001 Census shows the population of Spital to be 4,190. This was composed of 2,010 (47.97%) males and 2,180 (52.03%) females. There were 1,660 households.

Transport

Road
The M53 motorway, A41 road and B5137 road pass through or near the area.

Bus
Regular bus services, operated on behalf of Merseytravel, leave Spital cross-roads for various destinations around Merseyside.

Rail
Despite its small size, the area is served by Spital railway station on the Wirral Line of the Merseyrail network, with frequent services to Liverpool, Chester and Ellesmere Port. The station is staffed from early in the morning through to 10 minutes before the last train at night and there is a free car park with space for over 40 vehicles.

Notable people
 Former British Prime Minister Harold Wilson spent his adolescent years living in Spital.
 Paul Heaton Singer/Songwriter from The Housemartins and The Beautiful South was born in Spital.

References

External links

Towns and villages in the Metropolitan Borough of Wirral